Clarence Sydney Featherston (11 December 1892 – 22 June 1964) was an Australian rules footballer who played with Fitzroy in the Victorian Football League (VFL).

Notes

External links 
		

1892 births
1964 deaths
Australian rules footballers from Melbourne
Fitzroy Football Club players
People from Carlton, Victoria